Nyanzale is a town and a camp for Internally Displaced People (IDPs) in the Rutshuru territory of North Kivu province, Democratic Republic of the Congo.

It is a small town which population has more than doubled with the arrival of 20,000 displaced people. They fled in January 2007 out of fear of fighting between the rebels of the Forces Démocratiques pour la Libération du Rwanda and Forces Armées de la République Démocratique du Congo dominated by Laurent N'Kunda's soldiers. They are also avoiding armed bandits that live in the bush. Armed banditry is a problem, since unemployed soldiers and a surplus of small arms from years of fighting are a bad mix. Unicef tries to help the refugees.

Gallery

References

North Kivu